Grzegorz Wdowiak (born 20 November 1970) is a Polish rower. He competed in the men's lightweight double sculls event at the 1996 Summer Olympics.

References

1970 births
Living people
Polish male rowers
Olympic rowers of Poland
Rowers at the 1996 Summer Olympics
Rowers from Warsaw